The World Athletics Indoor Tour, formerly the IAAF World Indoor Tour, is an annual series of indoor track and field meetings, held since 2016. It was designed to create a Diamond League-style circuit for indoor track and field events, to raise the profile of indoor track and field, and replaced the IAAF Indoor Permit Meetings series.

The tour was announced with initially four meetings, three in Europe and one in the United States, leading to the 2016 IAAF World Indoor Championships in Portland, Oregon. Winners of the Tour enjoy similar privileges in relation to World Indoor Championships qualification as Diamond League winners do in relation to the World Athletics Championships. The tour was initially in place for two years.

The Düsseldorf leg was added for the 2017 Tour, and the Stockholm leg was replaced by the International Copernicus Cup, a long-standing indoor event in Torún, Poland. In 2018, the tour became a permanent fixture, and the Meeting Ville de Madrid was added as the sixth event on the tour. For 2020, the tour added a seventh leg in Lievin, France.

In 2021, the tour expanded by introducing three levels of competition: Gold, Silver and Bronze, mirroring the expanded outdoor World Athletics Continental Tour. In 2022, the tour expanded with the fourth tier: Challenger.

The tour is organised to allow for major indoor championships including the World Athletics Indoor Championships and the European Athletics Indoor Championships and, where appropriate, national championships and trials.

Editions

(Gold Standard) Meetings

In keeping with the indoor season generally, the season for the World Athletics Indoor Tour is considerably shorter than for the outdoor Diamond League, with the tour concluded in little over a month, and meetings often held only a few days apart. The meetings in Karlsruhe and Boston are the only ever-presents in history of the tour. The most recent addition is the Millrose Games, added for the first time in 2022. Typically, major international championship events take place after the conclusion of the tour season.

Scoring system
At each meeting a minimum of 12 events are to be staged. Included in the 12 events will be a core group of five or six events split across the two-season cycle.

For example: tour events for 2016 and 2018 were the men's 60m, 800m, 3000/5000m, pole vault, triple jump and shot put, plus the women's 400m, 1500m, 60m hurdles, high jump and long jump.

In 2017 and 2019 the tour events were the women's 60m, 800m, 3000/5000m, pole vault, triple jump and shot put, as well as the men's 400m, 1500m, 60m hurdles, high jump and long jump.

Points will be allocated to the best four athletes in each event, with the winner getting 10 points, the runner up receiving seven points, the third-placed finisher getting five points and the athlete in fourth receiving three points.

The individual overall winner of each event will receive US$20,000 in prize money and, beginning with the 2016 edition in Portland, will automatically qualify for the next edition of the World Athletics Indoor Championships as a ‘wild card’ entry, provided the member federation of that World Indoor Tour winner agrees to enter the athlete. The individual overall winner of each event received a US$10,000 bonus in 2021.

Current Meetings

2023
The tour one more time expanded in 2023.

Winners

The following table sets out the overall winners of World Indoor Tour disciplines in each year of the Tour.

Men's track

Men's field

Women's track

Women's field

World Athletics Indoor Tour records
The following tour records are correct as of the end of the 2023 World Athletics Indoor Tour.

 Men's Indoor Tour records

Women's Indoor Tour records

Other records

See also

References

External links
Official website

 
Recurring sporting events established in 2016
Annual athletics series
Indoor Tour
Indoor track and field competitions